Teamwork Motion Pictures Ltd. (Traditional Chinese: 天幕製作有限公司) is a former Hong Kong film production company. The company was established by Cantopop star, actor and film producer Andy Lau, serving as a producer for film in which Lau appeared as an actor. Following an intense lawsuit in 2002 with producing partner Clement Mak, Lau renamed the company to Focus Group Holdings Limited.

Establishment
Teamwork was established in 1991 by actor/producer Andy Lau as a company involved in film distribution and production. In 2000, Lau invested and collaborated with Clement Mak of CCT Telecoms to form to Teamwork Group, which consisted of the following company and four major subsidiaries:

Teamwork Corporation Limited, a holding company
Topman Global Limited, which deals with artist management
Topman Holdings Limited, which is responsible for ownership and management of all Artist's Intellectual Property Rights in the Content and Films assigned
Andy World Club Limited, which engages in the organisation of functions and activities.

Films
Teamwork made a total of sixteen films, which include Saviour of the Soul, Moon Warriors, Dance of a Dream, A Fighter's Blues, and Fulltime Killer, all of which featured Lau as an actor and producer with Clement Mak as the films' presenter.

Lawsuit
Lau's collaboration with CCT Telecoms and his partner, Clement Mak turned sour in June 2002 when his artist management contract expired and was not renewed. CCT Telecoms then sent out restriction letters to several production companies from hiring Lau in any sort of performance. Lau then retaliated by sending a lawyer's letter seeking HK$15 million worth of salary that Teamwork owned him.

Then CCT's subsidiary company, Noble Trend International, filed a lawsuit seeking HK$150 million compensation and an injunction order on Lau for violating shareholders' agreement contract. CCT Telecoms further applied another injunction order on Lau for his involvement in the movie Infernal Affairs. Lau lashed back by exclaiming in reports:

 
The career-threatening lawsuit spanned for months and the hearing was scheduled for 31 October 2002. Allegations and news of an out-of-court settlement with all kinds of conditions started to spread in the newspapers. Indeed, the lawsuit had reach an out-of-court settlement on the day of the hearing as Lau got full control of Teamwork Group without paying a cent. Lau was quoted for saying:

 
Later, Lau renamed the company to Focus Group Holdings Limited in order give the company a fresh start.

Filmography
 Give Them A Chance (給他們一個機會) (2003)
 The Runaway Pistol (走火槍) (2002)
 Fulltime Killer (全職殺手) (2001)
 Dance of a Dream (愛君如夢) (2001)
 A Fighter's Blues (阿虎) (2000)
 The Longest Summer (去年煙花特別多) (1998)
 Made in Hong Kong (香港製造) (1997)
 Thanks for Your Love (1/2次同床) (1996)
 Tian Di (天與地) (1994)
 Women on the Run (赤裸狂奔) (1993)
 Days of Tomorrow (天長地久) (1993)
 Moon Warriors (戰神傳說) (1992)
 Saviour of the Soul II (９２神雕俠侶之痴心情長劍) (1992)
 Never-Ending summer (吳三桂與陳圓圓) (1992)
 Gameboy Kids (機Boy小子之真假威龍) (1992)
 Saviour of the Soul (９１神雕俠侶) (1991)

References

Defunct companies of Hong Kong
Mass media companies established in 1991
Mass media companies disestablished in 2004
Film production companies of Hong Kong
1991 establishments in Hong Kong